Bruce Bilson (born May 19, 1928) is an American film director and television director. He is most notable for his work as a regular director on the spy spoof Get Smart. He won the 1967–1968 Primetime Emmy Award for Outstanding Directing for a Comedy Series for the third season Get Smart episode "Maxwell Smart, Private Eye".

Life and career
Bilson was born in Brooklyn to Jewish parents. His mother, Hattie Bilson (née Dratwa; 1907-2004), was an American screenwriter, and his father, George Bilson (1902–1981), was a British producer/writer/director of Ashkenazi Jewish descent who was born in Leeds, England. His brother, Malcolm is a fortepianist and professor of piano at Cornell University.

Bilson graduated from UCLA School of Theater, Film and Television in 1950.

Family
Bilson married Mona Weichman on August 31, 1955; they divorced in 1976. They had two children, Danny Bilson (born 1956), a film and video game writer/producer and father of Rachel Bilson, and Julie Ahlberg, a film producer.

Bilson married Renne Jarrett in 1981.

Filmography

Film
Pate Katelin en Buenos Aires (1969)
The Girl Who Came Gift-Wrapped (1974)
The Wackiest Wagon Train in the West (1976)
The North Avenue Irregulars (1979)
Chattanooga Choo Choo (1984)

Television 

The Andy Griffith Show (assistant director 1960–1963)
Please Don't Eat the Daisies (TV series, 1965)
The Patty Duke Show (TV series, 1965, 1 episode)
Gidget (TV series) (1965)
Hogan's Heroes (TV series, 1965)
Camp Runamuck (TV series, 1966, 1 episode)
Bewitched (TV series, 1968, 1 episode)
The Ghost & Mrs. Muir (TV series, 1968)
Blondie (TV series, 1968)
The Doris Day Show (TV series, 1968, 1 episode)
Get Smart (TV series, 1965–1968, 22 episodes)
Nanny and the Professor (TV series, 1970)
Bonanza (TV series, 1970, 1 episode)
Arnie (TV series, 1970)
Barefoot in the Park (TV series, 1970)
The Mary Tyler Moore Show (TV series, 1971–1977)
The Odd Couple (TV series, 1970–1971, 5 episodes)
Green Acres (TV series, 1971, 1 episode)
Love, American Style (TV series, 1969–1971, 8 episodes)
Alias Smith and Jones (TV series, 1972, 1 episode)
The Paul Lynde Show (TV series, 1972, 1 episode)
Temperatures Rising (TV series, 1972, 1 episode)
M*A*S*H (TV series, 1972, 1 episode)
The Brady Bunch (TV series, 1973, 1 episode)
The Six Million Dollar Man (TV series, 1974)
Dusty's Trail (TV series, 1974, 1 episode)
Sierra (TV series, 1974)
The Rookies (TV series, 1974–1975, 3 episodes)

Dead Man on the Run (TV movie, 1975)
When Things Were Rotten (TV series, 1975)
Emergency! (TV series, 1975, 1 episode)
Barbary Coast (TV series, 1975, 1 episode)
Hawaii Five-O (TV series, 1974–1976, 5 episodes)
S.W.A.T. (TV series, 1975–1976, 3 episodes)
Wonder Woman (TV series, 1976)
Tabitha (TV series, 1976, 1 episode)
The New Daughters of Joshua Cabe (TV movie, 1976)
Alice (TV series, 1976)
Barney Miller (TV series, 1976–1981, 10 episodes)
Hunter (TV series, 1977)
The Feather and Father Gang (TV series, 1977, 1 episode)
The Love Boat (TV series, 1977)
Quark (TV series, 1978, 1 episode)
B.J. and the Bear (TV movie, 1978)
Pleasure Cove (TV movie, 1979)
Dallas Cowboys Cheerleaders (TV movie, 1979)
Delta House (TV series, 1979)
Turnabout (TV series, 1979, 1 episode)
The Bad News Bears (TV series, 1979)
The Ghosts of Buxley Hall (TV movie: Disney's Wonderful World, 1980)
Harper Valley PTA (1981, 3 episodes)
Half Nelson (1985, pilot episode)
The Bradys (1990, 3 episodes)
The Flash (TV series, 1991)

References

External links

 

1928 births
American television directors
Television producers from New York City
American television writers
American male television writers
Jewish American writers
Living people
Film directors from New York City
Screenwriters from New York (state)
UCLA Film School alumni
21st-century American Jews
American Ashkenazi Jews